Kord Kandi (also Romanized as Kord Kandī) is a village in Sardabeh Rural District, in the Central District of Ardabil County, Ardabil Province, Iran. At the 2006 census, its population was 222, in 58 families.

References 

Towns and villages in Ardabil County